The 2021–2022 Belarus–European Union border crisis is a migrant crisis consisting of an influx of tens of thousands of immigrants, primarily from Iraqi Kurdistan, with smaller groups hailing from elsewhere in Asia and from parts of Africa, to Lithuania, Latvia and Poland via those countries' borders with Belarus. The crisis was triggered by the severe deterioration in Belarus–European Union relations, following the 2020 Belarusian presidential election, the 2020–2021 Belarusian protests, the Ryanair Flight 4978 incident and subsequent sanctions on Belarus, as well as the attempted forced repatriation of Olympic sprinter Krystsina Tsimanouskaya from Tokyo, Japan.

The crisis began sometime around July 7, 2021, when Belarus's dictatorial ruler Alexander Lukashenko threatened to "flood" the EU with "Drugs and migrants". Later, Belarusian authorities and state-controlled tourist enterprises, together with some airlines operating in the Middle East, started promoting tours to Belarus by increasing the number of connections from the Middle East and giving those who bought them Belarusian visas, ostensibly for hunting purposes. Social media groups were additionally offering fraudulent advice on the rules of crossing the border to the prospective migrants, most of whom were trying to reach Germany. Those who arrived in Belarus were then given instructions about how and where to trespass the European Union (EU) border, and what to tell the border guards on the other side of the border. Migrants said that Belarus provided them with wire cutters and axes to cut through border fences and enter the EU; however, those who did not manage to cross the border were often forced to stay there by Belarusian authorities, who were accused of assaulting some migrants who failed to get across. Lukashenko later confirmed that the involvement of Belarusian border troops is "absolutely possible". Belarus refused to allow Polish humanitarian aid for the migrants, which would have included tents and sleeping bags.

Poland, Lithuania, and Latvia have described the crisis as hybrid warfare, calling the crisis an incident of human trafficking of migrants, waged by Belarus against the EU. The three governments declared a state of emergency and announced their decisions to build border walls on their borders with Belarus, with Poland approving an estimated €353 million in spending to build a  barrier. The EU sent additional supporting officers and patrol cars to Lithuania, and 12 EU governments stated their support for a physical barrier along the border.

Human rights organizations voiced concerns over the use of asylum seeker pushbacks by Lithuanian and Polish border guards, the denial of the possibility to lodge an asylum claim, as well as inadequate food, water, and shelter for the migrants, the latter of which was a subject of a European Court of Human Rights (ECHR) order. Polish officials have additionally been criticised for not allowing journalists, doctors, and non-governmental organizations to the border. Human Rights Watch accused Belarusian authorities of manufacturing the crisis, making Belarusian border guards responsible for violence, inhuman and degrading treatment and coercion, and making Polish border guards responsible for pushing the migrants back to Belarus.

Background

Alexander Lukashenko has ruled Belarus since July 1994. The Lukashenko regime has been widely accused of electoral fraud in previous elections, including by Organization for Security and Co-operation in Europe (OSCE) observers, who were often restricted from monitoring election conduct. He claimed victory in the 2020 Belarusian presidential election, his sixth; however, this has not been recognised in an official capacity by the United States, the EU, the UK, Canada and their allies. According to independent digital exit polls, Lukashenko might have lost the elections to Sviatlana Tsikhanouskaya and the official results were generally implausible, particularly at the countrywide level but also on a sizeable portion of small electoral districts. Numerous countries refused to accept the result of the election, as did the European Union, which imposed sanctions on Belarusian officials deemed to be responsible for "violence, repression and election fraud". The results of the election also led to widespread protests in Belarus.

After the election, security forces brought the primary opposition candidate Sviatlana Tsikhanouskaya to the border with Lithuania and pushed her to cross the border under threats of repercussions, which could have possibly affected her children. On 11 August, Lithuanian Foreign Minister Linas Linkevičius announced that Tsikhanouskaya was "safe" in Lithuania while also acknowledging that she had "few options".

On 23 May 2021, Ryanair Flight 4978 was intercepted while in Belarusian airspace and forced to land at Minsk National Airport where two of its passengers, opposition activist and journalist Roman Protasevich and his girlfriend Sofia Sapega, were arrested by authorities. Following the incident, the United States, EU, the United Kingdom and Canada issued a joint statement on 21 June announcing further sanctions against members and supporters of the Government of Belarus as well as Belarusian state-owned companies. These included individual travel bans, asset freezes and other sanctions. The European Union also banned Belarusian carriers from flying into EU airspace and imposed economic sanctions on Belarus.

At the 2020 Summer Olympics in Tokyo, during July and August 2021, Belarusian sprinter Krystsina Tsimanouskaya criticized national coaches, who then tried to force her back to Belarus; she sought help at the airport and was subsequently granted asylum in Poland.

Key features

Ethnic and religious minorities from Iraq (Kurds and Yazidis) are the most frequent category of migrants. According to the CBC investigation, many flee persecution from the Islamic State, but also many migrants come from the Kurdistan Region, which is among the safest in the Middle East; they seek a better life abroad due to the lack of opportunities in the region. Thus most of the migrants are Iraqi Kurds but also include numbers of Iraqi Arabs, Syrians, Yemenites, in addition to some from other regions in both Asia and Africa, including from Afghanistan and Cameroon, notwithstanding a number of Russians.

A reform.by investigation reported that Iraqi TV repeatedly broadcast statements of Lukashenko about a green light for illegal migration to the EU. News about Belarus–EU tensions were widely discussed in Iraq. Equally high attention to the news related to possible migration to the EU was also reported in Syria. , the Lithuanian vice-minister of internal affairs, said that Belarusian authorities spread fake news, assuring the migrants that Belarus is a convenient gateway to Europe, in order to attract migrants and use them against the EU.

Services of airlines and tourist agencies 
It was reported that Iraqi travel agencies were organizing "tourist trips" to Belarus. According to a reform.by investigation, in 2021, tourist agencies in Iraq reduced prices for tours to Belarus making them more affordable, and the number of planes to Minsk was increased. Belarusian travel agencies were also active in promoting "tours" to Belarus from Iraq, which advertisement the French foreign ministry says could have been ultimately directed by the Belarusian authorities.  Iraqi Airways increased the frequency of service from Baghdad to Minsk to four times in a week; Belavia, Belarus's state-owned airline, also provided more offers to Middle East flyers. A journalist from Komsomolskaya Pravda noted that while the flight from Baghdad to Minsk carried about 180 people, only 5 people flew in the opposite direction. On 2 August, it was announced that three new destinations to Minsk were opened from the Iraqi cities of Basra, Erbil and Sulaymaniyah. The country's visa rules were also made much looser that month, allowing citizens of Middle Eastern countries to be issued a Belarusian visa on arrival in Minsk. As a result, tours to Belarus were considered to be one of the easiest and safest ways to get to the EU. Belavia was accused of orchestrating the influx of illegal migrants to Minsk. Another major air route was the Istanbul—Minsk flight operated by Belavia and the Turkish Airlines. On 28 October, Syrian Cham Wings Airlines, after having made several charter flights, launched a daily connection from Damascus to the Belarusian capital. In November, the top manager of the Minsk airport said that the airport was planning to organize new flights to Algeria, Ethiopia, Iran, Kenya, Morocco, Moldova, Qatar, Venezuela and Vietnam.

Belarusian state-owned Tsentrkurort travel agency, which is subordinated to the presidential administration of Belarus, is named among the organizations directly responsible for human trafficking. On 13 August, Russian Dossier and German Spiegel published an investigation based on leaked documents of Tsentrkurort, according to which Tsentrkurort made business with different travel agencies, helping to make visas for hundreds of Iraqi citizens with a "hunting tour" as a legal justification of the tour. The company also organized the transfer of people from the airport to hotels in Minsk. Oskartur travel agency was named another major party involved in this particular scheme. Contentions exist that the label of "hunting tours" are a cover story, since COVID-19 pandemic travel laws have two exceptions to avoid quarantine for foreigners: business trips and hunting. Migrants were allowed in Minsk hostels even though some of them had their visas expired. Belarusian minister of finance  reported that the migrants are profitable for Belarusian economy because they bring cash to the country and fill up hotels. It was also reported that several fly-by-night companies and two travel agencies (Oskartur and Vizak) got full access to the international zone of Minsk airport and were even delegated the power, normally reserved to the border guards, to issue visas to the newly arrived people from the Middle East. It was noted that these companies enjoyed the patronage of the airport staff and authorities, while other travel agencies were not allowed to provide similar services for real tourists.

On the border 

According to the investigation of LRT, the Lithuanian state media outlet, Iraqi Kurds claimed that they were told that entering the European Union via Belarus was legal. After a few days in Belarusian hotels, migrants were collected, taken to the border and instructed to proceed on foot, believing that a car would be waiting for them in Lithuania. It was reported that they paid up to €15,000 for travel and tourist visas as well as US$3,000–4,000 deposits. According to the investigation of Belarusian news server reform.by, people from the Middle East believe that they should destroy their passport in order to avoid deportation from the EU. Belsat TV journalists found groups in social networks and Telegram groups which provide help and advice for those who cross the Belarus–Lithuania border. Videos of people crossing fences on the Lithuanian side were published there. Migrants repeatedly used the cover story that they are students from Belarusian universities.

The involvement of Belarusian authorities was unclear during first weeks of the crisis, but it became obvious after several published videos with Belarusian border guards (including the  border guards' special forces) assisting migrants to cross the border and preventing them from returning to Belarus. In July, anonymous sources among Belarusian border guards claimed that their bosses had started to encourage cigarette smuggling via checkpoints and to encourage gaps in border cover. Another border guard told reform.by about receiving a verbal order to turn a blind eye to illegal migrants. It was also reported that Belarusian border guards stopped communicating with their Lithuanian colleagues. Lithuanian border guards claimed to have visual proofs representing assistance of human traffickers from the Belarusian side: for example, warning them of Lithuanian patrols approaching and indicating which direction to run. On 3 August, Lithuanian authorities published footage made by a Frontex helicopter with a group of migrants and a special vehicle used by Belarusian State Border Committee visible. According to the Lithuanian Minister of Defence Arvydas Anušauskas, unidentified people wearing camouflage uniform instructed the migrants in Belarus before transfer to the border. They gave the migrants advices what to say under interrogation and what to keep silent about. A number of migrants reported that Belarusian security forces helped them by coordinating sneaking through the border, and a conversation was overheard in which a Belarusian guard ordered a few hundred migrants to go to another Belarusian checkpoint in order to spread the flow of those wanting to get to the European Union. The Times additionally reported about migrants brought to the border at gunpoint or trucked by people wearing balaclavas; the migrants were then additionally given planks to cross a small border river called Svislach. Later in the crisis, the migrants would be given tools to destroy the border infrastructure (see Poland section). Exiled politician Pavel Latushko claimed that the Belarusian military trained several war veterans from Iraq and Afghanistan to carry out attacks on borders and inside the EU. It was stressed that Belarus previously received significant financial assistance to strengthen the border: in 2001–2012, Belarus received €47.5 million for "integrated border management" and €21 million additionally for related regional projects. After 2012, Belarus received at least €15 million for border-related issues (excluding customs). In particular, EU funded the reequipment of Belarusian border infrastructure which was considered a "significant and effective" help, paid for special BOMBEL project against illegal migration and other projects (AENEAS and AWABEL). On 19 November, Alexander Lukashenko confirmed that the involvement of the border troops is "absolutely possible".

Illegal migrants enjoyed full permissiveness violating several Belarusian laws without any punishment. Belarusian lawyer Mikhail Kiryliuk suggested that the migrants made at least five violations of the Code about administrative offenses (articles 11.3, 16.17, 18.20, 18.29, 24.23) and three violations of the Criminal Code (293, 371, 126). He also suggested that inaction of the Belarusian military who stood just behind the migrants attacking Polish border guards can be treated as a violation of the Criminal Code.

Smugglers pick those migrants who managed to cross the border in the EU and transfer them westwards (usually to Germany). While human trafficking is a crime, Polish authorities have encountered misinformation suggesting that Poland allowed such operations to take place. Up to 4 November 2021, 235 people have been detained in Podlaskie Voivodeship alone due to human trafficking charges since the crisis on the Polish border began. However, those migrants who fail to cross the border are often prohibited to return home from Belarus and are forced to stay on the border (one of the tactics used by the Belarusian military was compared to anti-retreat forces). A group of Yazidi migrants complained to reporters that they were beaten by Belarusian border guards when they tried to return to Iraq after an unsuccessful attempt to sneak to Poland. The guards, according to these people, forced them to stay on the border. An Iraqi Kurd who decided to seek political asylum in Belarus after unsuccessful attempt to sneak to Poland claimed that the Belarusian police used a stun gun and forced him to leave the country after he declared his wish to stay in Belarus as a legal refugee. According to the Human Rights Watch research, Belarusian border guards gathered those migrants who were pushed back from Poland to Belarus detaining and abusing them in special sites and not letting them to return to Minsk or their home.

The main purpose of the Lukashenko-led crisis is, according to Maksim Samorukov of the Carnegie Moscow Center, the attempt to legitimize his rigged reelection in 2020 and to lift sanctions by showing his ability to stop the influx of migrants.

Lithuania
Lithuania has a  border with Belarus. The border is described as poorly protected, often with low wooden fences or small ditches. Lithuania did not have the necessary infrastructure to accommodate large numbers of migrants.

According to public figures, the country had 81 refugees in 2020. Lithuanian and EU officials claim that the illegal immigration was weaponized by the Belarusian president as a response to the harsh sanctions the EU imposed on Belarus, which were imposed due to election fraud, oppression of protests, and the forced landing of Ryanair Flight 4978. Belarusian opposition leader Sviatlana Tsikhanouskaya is currently living exile in Lithuania, whose government officially recognizes her as the legitimate president of Belarus.

In June, Lukashenko threatened to allow human traffickers and drug smugglers into Europe. Later Lukashenko talked about the possible emergence of armed migrants, which was perceived by the Lithuanian officials as a threat.

Events 

In the years preceding the crisis, the number of illegal migrants crossing into Lithuania via Belarus averaged around 70. However, in June 2021, the number of illegal migrants who were detained rose to around 470, rising to thousands the next month. Lithuanian officials said that Belarusian authorities were encouraging illegal migration from Iraq and Syria to Lithuania by organizing groups of refugees and helping them cross the Belarusian-Lithuanian border. European officials blamed Belarusian travel agencies for helping illegal migrants. The majority of migrants were from Iraq, but citizens of other Middle Eastern and African countries were also among them. Their final destination is usually not Lithuania, but Germany.

Belarusian authorities were harshly critical of the EU's decisions. On 28 June, Belarus unilaterally withdrew from its readmission agreement with the EU. The Belarusian representative at the OSCE criticized European officials for politicizing the problem and not cooperating with Belarus. In August, Lukashenko hinted at the possibility of sending not only illegal migrants but also radioactive materials for a "dirty bomb" through the border.

Incidents
 On 23 June, migrants rioted in a camp in Pabradė. Tear gas was used to suppress the protests.
 On 23 July, two children who illegally crossed the border with their families were hospitalized in Lithuania after Belarusian human traffickers gave them unknown pills to calm them down. According to the laboratory tests, the pills contained methadone.
 On 26 July, migrants demanded to leave the camp. 16 migrants were detained.

 On 5 August, Belarusian officials, wearing uniforms, riot shields and helmets, were recorded on camera near the Belarus–Lithuania border pushing and urging the migrants to cross the European Union border.
 On the night from 5 to 6 August, Lithuanian officials reported that they saw Belarusian officials using signal flares and heard shooting of live ammunition from assault rifles into the air from the Belarusian side.
 On 7 August, Iraq announced that it was stopping all flights from Iraq to Minsk, except for empty planes which would return Iraqis from Belarus.
 On 18 August, the Lithuanian State Border Guard Service published a video of 12 Belarusian officers in riot gear illegally crossed into the Lithuanian territory while pushing a group of migrants.
 On 7 October, Belarusian border guards reported a dead migrant from Sri Lanka found near the Lithuanian border.

Response

Illegal migration from Belarus forced the Lithuanian government to declare a state-level "extraordinary situation" (similar but weaker legal regime than the state of emergency) on 2 July 2021. Lithuania had no experience in dealing with large numbers of illegal migrants and lacked places to accommodate them. Tent camps, which Lithuanian officials described as "not comfortable", were built to accommodate migrants. On 23 July, Lithuanian authorities published a plan to build a container camp near Švenčionėliai for 40,000 migrants in the worst-case scenario. Also that month, residents of Dieveniškės protested against proposed construction of a new camp in their region. On 26 or 27 July, locals tried to block a road to the area near Rūdininkai where a migrant camp was to be placed.

Also in July, the Lithuanian Seimas passed a law (signed by president Gitanas Nausėda on 21 July) making deportation of illegal migrants from Lithuania easier. The public opinion in Lithuania opposes illegal migration and xenophobic sentiment is reported to have spread.

Lithuanian Foreign Minister Gabrielius Landsbergis travelled to Baghdad in order to discuss the problem with the Iraqi authorities. During the trip, he requested the Iraqi government to halt the flights to Belarus. On a separate occasion in mid-July, Landsbergis stated that of those who crossed the border illegally, virtually none would be granted asylum and they would be detained in a tent camp until they could be sent home. By early August 2021, Lithuania had processed 230 asylum applications, all of which were later rejected.

In the meantime, in early July, Lithuania announced a plan to build a border barrier to stem the flow of illegal crossings. The cost of the project is estimated at €150 million and the Lithuanian parliament approved it as a matter of urgency. Other countries and institutions sent reinforcements to assist with the surge. On 24 July, Estonia sent 100 km of barbed wire to help Lithuania to build the border barrier and three drones for the Lithuanian border guards. Non-EU member Ukraine also sent more than 38 tonnes of barbed wire to Lithuania. Meanwhile, by the end of July, EU Frontex deployed 100 officers, 30 patrol cars and 2 helicopters to support Lithuania. Poland provided another helicopter.

By 7–8 August, the number of migrants crossing into the country dropped to almost zero after Lithuania sent reinforcements to the border area and began broadcasting warning messages in Arabic, Kurdish, French, Russian and English on loudspeakers.

As the number of migrants on the Polish borders surged, and some of them were active in damaging its infrastructure, on 9 November, the Parliament of Lithuania declared the state of emergency in the border regions for one month, prohibiting entry in the area within  of the border without Lithuanian State Border Guard Service's approval and authorising the border guards to use "mental coercion" and proportionate physical force to contain the surge.

According to a poll conducted in August, 33% (the highest portion) of respondents in Lithuania answered that the best solution to the migration crisis would be to build a physical fence or a wall with Belarus. Other solutions in the answers included: pressure to Iraq, with the help of the EU, to stop the flights to Minsk (17%); requesting a transfer of some migrants to the other EU states (14%); and paying the migrants for their voluntary return (12%). Another 10% suggested negotiations with Lukashenko and only 3% suggested accepting the migrants with the strong integration programs in place. The remaining 11% did not answer or did not have an opinion.

On 18 January 2023, the Lithuanian government renounced a previous agreement with Belarus. The agreement, which was signed in 2006, had established topics of cross-border partnership. Lithuania's Interior Ministry stated that the current situation made cooperation impossible.

Poland

On 12 July 2021, Polish President Andrzej Duda stated that Poland would provide assistance to Lithuania, which it sent later that month. Following the granting of humanitarian visas to an Olympic athlete Krystsina Tsimanouskaya and her husband, Poland also accused Belarus of organizing hybrid warfare as the number of migrants crossing the Belarus–Poland border sharply increased when compared to the 2020 statistics. On 6 August, Poland reported 133 illegal crossings from Belarus over two days, which is more than the total number in the previous year, with the total number of illegal crossings up to that date being 552. On 9 August, Poland reported an additional 349 migrant arrivals over the weekend. The number of intercepted attempts increased significantly in the autumn. In September 2021, Polish authorities estimated the number of migrants waiting to sneak from Belarus to the EU at 10,000. In total, there were more than 32,000 intercepted attempts of immigrants to cross the Polish border as of 11 November 2021, of which 3,500 attempts were made in August, almost 7,700 in September and almost 17,300 in October. In November 2021, the Polish government estimated that 3,000–4,000 migrants were waiting in the vicinity of the border.

In early August, a group of 32 Afghans and 41 Iraqi Kurds appeared on the border in the aftermath of the fall of Kabul and were denied entry to either country, resulting in lines of military personnel on each side isolating the encamped migrants. Their appearance follows an influx of thousands of mostly Western Asian migrants that had crossed the border from Belarus into Poland and other eastern EU members Latvia and Lithuania in the months leading up to the fall of Kabul, with the EU claiming that Belarus purposefully engineered the migration in response to union sanctions. While the Belarusian government denied this accusation, Poland called it a "hybrid attack" on the bloc and said the migrants should not be allowed entry because they are technically still in Belarus. After the migrants sought asylum assistance, the European Court of Human Rights (ECHR) summoned Poland and Latvia to provide them "food, water, clothing, adequate medical care and, if possible, temporary shelter" for three weeks, according to a statement from the court on 25 August, although neither country was ordered to allow the migrants past the border.

Since 18 August 2021, the Polish Armed Forces were sent to secure the border with Belarus. As the number of attempted crossings increased, on 2 September, Poland announced a state of emergency in the areas close to the border, limiting the freedom of movement, freedom of assembly, and, controversially, ordering human rights activists and doctors unaffiliated with the Border Guard to go and effectively forbidding journalists from reporting from the area, which  described as an "informational blockade" instituted by Polish Prime Minister Mateusz Morawiecki. The majority of Polish outlets signed a letter demanding that journalists be allowed to enter the restricted zone. Because the Sejm already extended the state of emergency for another 60 days and since Article 230 of the Constitution of Poland prohibits to extend it further, the government announced that it would let the journalists in, while attempting to maintain most of the regulations barring people from entering the zone.

Just like Lithuania, Poland announced its intention to build a border wall with Belarus. On 25 October, Mariusz Błaszczak, the defence minister, announced the construction of a permanent border wall on Poland's 400 km border with Belarus at a cost of about 350 million euros. It also announced beefing up the security personnel at the border, which numbered 7,500 as of October 2021 and has steadily risen to 15,000 by mid-November, and using military helicopters to patrol the border.

In general, Poles are somewhat approving the government's actions on the border. In August 2021, a poll showed that 45 percent of the Polish public positively assess the government's handling of a migrant standoff on the Belarus-Poland border while 29 percent were critical of it and 26 percent had no opinion. A survey in October found fewer people undecided about the issue of migration, with 54 percent supportive of the government policies and 36 percent opposed, while the one in November saw many more people undecided – a quarter of respondents did not have an opinion on the topic, and the support dropped to 39 percent, with the same proportion of disapproving opinions as the previous month. Moreover, in November 2021, a poll appeared that suggested that some 54.5% of those surveyed were in favour of the policy of pushbacks.

In October 2021, the head of the ruling Law and Justice party (PiS) and Poland's deputy Prime Minister Jarosław Kaczyński accused the Polish opposition parties of supporting Lukashenko's actions. In November 2021, Poland's state-controlled news channel, TVP Info, accused the Polish opposition of "supporting migrants and Lukashenko."

On 8 November, former Polish prime minister Donald Tusk called for Poland to invoke Article 4 of the North Atlantic Treaty, which would convene a meeting of NATO members to discuss the crisis.

On 15 November, the National Bank of Poland announced that it will issue commemorative coins and banknotes dedicated to the defense of the eastern border.

On 18 November, Polish authorities announced that Belarus should stop provocations on the border threatening to close the railroad border checkpoint Kuźnica—Bruzgi otherwise.

Timeline of border incidents

2021
Migrants who wanted to illegally cross the EU border into Poland used violence on several occasions, according to videos published by Polish Border Guard.

On 9 September 2021, the Polish Border Guard published a video of Belarusian military vehicles transporting migrants and instructing them on the Belarusian side of the border.

On 8 October, Polish authorities published a video with Belarusian border guards helping the migrants cross the border. On the same day, the Polish military reported shooting (presumably with blank cartridges) occurring from the Belarusian side.

On 25 October, Polish media reported about a clash between the Polish soldiers and about 60–70 migrants near the village of Usnarz Górny. Two Polish soldiers were injured by branches and stones, and unidentified people attempted to break a razor wire on the border.

On the night between 1 and 2 November, some unidentified uniformed men entered a few hundred meters into the Polish territory and subsequently fled back to Belarus, which made the Polish ministry of foreign affairs to summon the Belarusian chargé d'affaires.

On 8 November, a big crowd of several hundred illegal migrants, escorted by the Belarusian military (presumably Belarusian siloviki), tried to break through the Belarus–Poland border near Bruzgi, Grodno Region. The Polish border guards were expecting the column to arrive since the weekend preceding the attempted breakthrough, while the first reports about the big column of migrants heading to the Bruzgi-Kuźnica border crossing appeared in the morning that day. According to reform.by, the majority of migrants in this group were Iraqi Kurds, who organized and gathered via social media. Belarusian authorities did not allow migrants to go to the neutral zone via the border crossing, but forwarded them to the neutral zone through the nearby forest. Both sides published videos showing attempts to cut the barbed wire with wire cutters and scissors, provided by the Belarusian military, or to destroy it with logs. The migrants threw stones at Polish border guards, who used tear gas in response. Some 21,000 soldiers, border guards and policemen were concentrated in the area. According to The Guardian and Associated Press, the standoff was an attempt to increase pressure on Poland and the European Union by Lukashenko. The atmosphere calmed down the following day.

Due to the standoff, the Polish government closed the border crossing at Kuźnica, to the north-east of Białystok. As the traffic was directed to other border crossings, they saw immense queues, with Rzeczpospolita reporting a  traffic jam full of lorries towards Bobrowniki checkpoint, which it estimated could be passed in 67 hours. The Polish government considered the closure of the whole border with Belarus. The situation on the border also prompted Estonia, France and Ireland to convene a meeting of the UN Security Council to discuss the matter on 11 November, and some human rights organisations, including the Helsinki Committee for Human Rights, to sue Belarus in the International Criminal Court, alleging crimes against humanity (Belarus is not party to the ICC). Belarus, in its turn, dismisses the allegations as a ploy to detract the inhabitants of the European Union from its own problems. Local representatives of the United Nations High Commissioner for Refugees and International Organization for Migration who visited the camp near Bruzgi offered the migrants to voluntarily return home or to apply for refugee status in Belarus.

Belarus's leader raised the possibility of interrupting the Yamal–Europe pipeline carrying Russian gas to the European Union if the bloc imposes further sanctions on Belarus. However, Russian President Vladimir Putin, whose consent was needed before closing the pipe, said that Lukashenko had not consulted him before raising the possibility of stopping gas deliveries coming from Russia to the EU via a pipeline through Belarus, adding that such a move would risk harming relations between the two countries.

On 12 November, the Polish Border Guard reported that the Belarusian side was destroying the border fence near Czeremcha and used green lasers and strobe lights in an apparent attempt to blind the patrolling officers, which claim the Belarusians denied. The usage of lasers as blinding weapons is generally prohibited by the United Nations Protocol on Blinding Laser Weapons.

On 16 November 2021, the migrants undertook another major attempt to break through the border forcefully. They started to throw rocks, bottles and pieces of wood at the Polish border guards and tried to destroy the border fence in attempt to break through the border at the temporarily closed checkpoint of Bruzgi-Kuźnica. Polish border guards used water cannons, stun grenades and tear gas on the migrants. Polish authorities accused the Belarusian military of supplying the migrants and giving them stun grenades. One Polish officer was wounded in the head. Altogether, Poland registered 161 attempts of illegal border crossing into its territory on 16 November.

2022

In December 2022, the activist group Podlaskie Ochotnicze Pogotowie Humanitarne received tens of requests of help from refugees on the border per week.

2023
On 7 January, Yemeni doctor Ibrahem Jaber Ahmed Dehya died from exposure in Białowieża Forest. The border guards detained three of the group who requested help while Ibrahim was ill but still alive. According to Ibrahem's colleagues, the border guards initially refused to search for Ibrahem, instead expulsing the three to Belarus. Other colleagues of Ibrahem searched again for help and found a second patrol, which searched for Ibrahim and found him dead. The activist group Grupa Granica accused the border guards of having pushed back Ibrahem's colleagues to Belarus. Ibrahem was buried two days later in Bohoniki.

On 4 February 2023, an Ethiopian woman fell ill near Hajnówka. Two men who sought help for her from police and border guards were deported to Belarus and found in ill health on the Belarusian side of the border several days later. The woman was found dead on 12 February on Polish territory. Grupa Granica called for prosecution of those responsible for her death, accusing the authorities of not fulfilling legal obligations of the right of asylum.

Latvia 

On 4 August 2021, it was reported that the situation on the Latvia–Belarus border was still relatively peaceful with only four registered incidents of illegal border crossing and a total of 27 third-country nationals detained in the whole 2021. However, that soon changed and already by 8 August, 101 additional third-country nationals had been detained for illegally crossing the Latvia–Belarus border.

On 13 August, Latvian Armed Forces (LAF) published a video showing three cases of armed Belarusian border guards trying to expel migrants to Latvia, and not allowing them return to Belarus. The video has not been interdependently proofed. Similar reports about Belarusian border guards pushing out migrants from Belarus to Latvia appeared later.

The Cabinet of Ministers of Latvia declared a state of emergency from 11 August until 10 November in the border municipalities of Ludza, Krāslava, and Augšdaugava, and also in Daugavpils city. The government prohibited the submission of applications for refugee status in these border regions, and all migrants captured there had to return to Belarus. President of Latvia Egils Levits said that under international law, refugees should apply for asylum in the first safe country they arrive after leaving their own countries, in this case – Belarus. On 12 November, the Latvian Saeima approved the construction of a border wall on the stretch with Belarus.

Latvian border guards reported having turned back over 6,500 people attempting to cross the border from Belarus since the introduction of the state of emergency in August 2021 up to March 2022. The findings of the researchers, however, suggest that what lies behind these figures are largely the same people who were/are subjected to daily pushbacks. This has been officially confirmed by a representative of the State Border Guard who stated in an interview that those apprehended at the border every day are largely the same individuals.

According to an independent estimate, the total number of individuals who have attempted to illegally cross the Latvian border since August 2021 could be as low as 250. The same study, based on remote interviews with approximately 30 of the migrants, has also alleged extreme violence and even torture against them at the hands of the Latvian "commandos", police and soldiers. Minister of the Interior of Latvia Marija Golubeva categorically denied the accusations, as did the Ministry of Defense. The State Border Guard called the accusations "blatant defamation" and pointed out that not a single case of the use or even complaints about the use of "physical force and/or special means" by a member of the State Border Guard, the National Armed Forces or the State Police against an illegal border crosser has been recorded, nor has the Emergency Medical Service any information about the injuries that could have been caused by such actions of the aforementioned institutions.

Other responses

European Union
The EU condemned the use of migrants as weapons, threatened to impose further sanctions on Belarus, and pressed Iraq to suspend migrant flights between Iraq and Belarus. Iraq had previously promised to establish a joint commission with the EU to address the issue. The EU initially refused a request by the Lithuanian government to help finance a border wall, noting its longstanding policy of not providing money for border barriers. In November, however, a proposal was circulated proposing some EU funding for "border infrastructure", provided the recipient countries permit the EU's own border agency Frontex to help manage the borders, which Poland has to date refused to do. Joanna Hosa of the European Council on Foreign Relations noted that "Poland has an ongoing battle with Brussels over the rule of law situation, and so Poland is trying to show that it can manage the problem alone. Asking the EU for help would not necessarily be an easy thing for the Polish government to do."

The EU and Archbishop Wojciech Polak, the head of Catholic Church in Poland, called for humanitarian organizations such as Médecins Sans Frontières to gain access to the borders to help migrants.

Other government actors 
 : The North Atlantic Treaty Organization condemned "the continued instrumentalisation of irregular migration artificially created by Belarus as part of hybrid actions targeted against Poland, Lithuania, and Latvia for political purposes."
 : Germany, one of the primary end destinations of many of the migrants, registered 2,000 asylum seekers who had passed through Belarus, compared to 26 during the first half of 2021. In October 2021, German foreign minister Heiko Maas said that the airlines that carry migrants to Belarus "make themselves into helpers of the rulers in Minsk." The municipal government of Munich declared its readiness to accept migrants. In November 2021, German chancellor Angela Merkel made a phone call to Lukashenko on this issue but Lukashenko's spokesperson Natallia Eismant and the German authorities voiced completely different versions about its content.
 : In July 2021, Estonia condemned the human trafficking organized by Belarusian authorities and sent its border patrols and tents to boost the protection of the Belarus–Lithuania border. On 6 August 2021, Estonia announced that it would raise the question of migrant crisis at the United Nations Security Council. On 17 November 2021, the Estonian government called almost 1,700 reserve soldiers to hold a snap defence readiness exercise; the reserve engineers will construct temporary fences in Estonia's border areas with Russia
 : On 11 November 2021, Ukraine announced that they would deploy 8,500 soldiers and police officers, as well as 15 helicopters, to the border with Belarus to prevent possible attempts by stranded migrants to cross into the country in order to reach the European Union.
 : In November 2021, the United Kingdom sent a contingent of troops (10 soldiers) from the Royal Engineers to support Poland's border security. This number was increased to 150 later that same month. On 9 December 2021, the United Kingdom's Ministry of Defence announced it would send 140 military engineers to provide Poland with support at its border with Belarus.
 : On 7 August 2021, Iraq stopped all direct flights to Belarus. Three months later, the government of Iraq closed two honorary consulates of Belarus in Baghdad and Erbil in an attempt to suppress the schemes of illegal migration via Belarus. On 18 November, Iraq organized a rescue flight from Minsk which took away 430 migrants who agreed to come back home. The second rescue flight was scheduled on 19 November, but it was cancelled for unknown reason.
 : In November 2021, Turkey restricted certain nationalities from buying tickets for flights to Belarus, potentially closing off one of the main routes that the EU says Belarus has used to fly in migrants by the thousand to engineer a humanitarian crisis on its frontier. EU officials welcomed this decision. Turkey also dismissed Polish allegations about aiding the migrant flow to its border.

Estonia

Estonia, which shares a border with the Russian Federation, has been mobilizing its troops to protect its Southeastern and Northeastern border and constructing border barriers from barbed wire. 17th Engineer Battalion is moving from its place of dislocation (Tapa) towards the Southeastern border. From 19 to 26 November, all flights around the Russian border are forbidden due to the construction of barriers for "hybrid attacks". In November, Estonia announced that they will send 100 troops from engineering, military police and reconnaissance units to Poland.

Attempts to prevent flights 
Despite Iraq stopping all direct flights to Belarus, the number of arrivals did not reduce as many people instead began using indirect routes via Dubai, Turkey, Lebanon or Ukraine. There were calls for Ireland, where many companies leasing airplanes are located, to revoke their leases to Belavia, the airline carrying most of the migrants to Belarus. Simon Coveney, the Irish Minister for Foreign Affairs, said forcing airlines to break these contracts would be difficult and instead called for further sanctions.

Belavia itself originally did not intend to restrict the flow of passengers from the Middle East to Belarus, saying that because it is not a border agency and they cannot distinguish migrants from other passengers, it may not decline services to its customers. Belarus's director of the aviation department of the ministry of transportation, Artem Sikorsky, additionally said that they were forced to fly to Istanbul because they had been shut out of the European Union in May due to the grounding of the plane carrying Roman Protasevich. However, on 12 November 2021, Belavia was legally required by Turkey to deny boarding on any flights to Belarus to the citizens of Iraq, Syria and Yemen. Two days later, Belavia announced that it would deny boarding to the citizens of said countries as well as Afghan nationals on flights from Dubai. Measures to prevent potential migrants from boarding on flights to Belarus were taken by the authorities of Lebanon, UAE and Uzbekistan.

Human rights issues

The legal status of migrants became more vulnerable after Belarus unilaterally withdrew from the readmission agreement with the EU, and up to 40% of migrants in Lithuanian camps belong to vulnerable groups. EU leaders have supported the Lithuanian government in its efforts.

On 4 August 2021, Belarusian border guards claimed that they found an Iraqi man in serious condition in Benyakoni, near the border with Lithuania. The unidentified man allegedly "died in the arms of the [Lithuanian] border guards". Belarusian President Alexander Lukashenko ordered an investigation into his death. The Lithuanian Interior Ministry dismissed the Belarusian reports that the Iraqi migrant had been found beaten to death after being turned away at the Lithuanian border, describing it as part of a hybrid war and disinformation being waged by Belarus.

Human rights activists accused Polish authorities of denying adequate medical care, food and shelter to stranded migrants, which prompted the intervention of the European Court of Human Rights. On 25 August 2021, the court ordered Poland and Latvia to provide the migrants food, water, clothing, adequate medical care and temporary shelter, should the countries have such possibility. Belarusian authorities refused to accept the Polish humanitarian aid intended for migrants who got stuck on the Belarusian-Polish border at least twice, in August and October.

A migrant from Yemen complained to reporters that Belarusian border guards beat up his companion and broke his leg. A group of Yazidis from Iraq made a similar complaint. They also reported food shortages and said they were cold, and some of them sick. Another migrant was reported to be thrown into a river by a Belarusian border guard. Belarusian border guards were also accused of robbing the migrants of their money, phones, documents and other things from their bags. One of the migrants claimed that he was forced by Belarusian border guards to pay US$100 to charge the phone. A Syrian migrant who managed to sneak into Poland but got caught there claimed that the Belarusian military threatened him not to return to Belarus, reportedly claiming that "if you come back, we will kill you". In November 2021, after Iraq launched rescue flights for its citizens, migrants on the Belarusian side of the border reported problems that hindered their return, such as an impossibility to leave the border zone among other problems.

In August Lithuania and in October Poland legalized pushback of migrants by force, which is illegal under EU and international law. Human rights group Amnesty International and other human rights organisations said that Poland and Lithuania breached migrants' rights, as they limit the access of asylum seekers to their territory. Eve Geddie, director of Amnesty International's European Institutions Office, stated that "Forcing people back who are trying to claim asylum without an individual assessment of their protection needs is against European and international law." Poland and Lithuania violated international laws including the prohibition on collective expulsions stipulated in the European Convention on Human Rights. Some of the migrants additionally claim that they were forcefully deported to their country of origin, as in the case of a family from Slemani, Iraqi Kurdistan, who reported to Rudaw that after they were able to enter Poland, they were told they would be transferred to a camp near Warsaw, but they were taken to the airport with some other migrants and flown to Erbil instead.

On 24 November 2021, Human Rights Watch published a report "Die Here or Go to Poland: Belarus’ and Poland's Shared Responsibility for Border Abuses" claiming "serious abuses on both sides of the border". HRW accused Belarusian border guards of violence, inhuman and degrading treatment and coercion, and Polish border guards — of pushing the migrants back to Belarus despite pleading for asylum. HRW accused Belarusian authorities of manufacturing the situation which resulted in at least 13 deaths, and suggested that some severe cases of inhumane treatment can be seen as a torture.

The groups "Grupa Granica"  and "Fundacja Ocalenie"  have emerged in Poland as activists providing humanitarian aid for migrants on the ground, as well as "Sienos Grupė"  in Lithuania. Famous human right activists such as Anna Alboth, Nawal Soufi, Serge Kollwelter and others have been joining the cause of helping migrants and refugees. 
Organizations and activists have been facing state ordered crack-downs and criminalization of their actions in both Poland and Lithuania.

Comparisons
The events were compared by some commentators and human rights activists to the migrant crisis at the Greece–Turkey border and Turkish President Erdoğan's repeated threat to Europe to expect millions of migrants if Turkey were to open its borders.

European Union foreign affairs chief Josep Borrell compared the situation on the Belarus–Poland border to the migrant crisis on the Morocco–Spain border.

Poland's Defence Minister Mariusz Blaszczak said the border barrier marking the frontier with Belarus would resemble the one built by Hungarian Prime Minister Viktor Orbán on Hungary's border with Serbia during a migrant crisis in 2015. Poland's Interior Minister Mariusz Kamiński said that the new razor-wire border fence armed with heat sensors and cameras will be similar to that on the Greece–Turkey border, with inspiration also drawn from the Hungarian border barrier.

Smuggling of cigarettes and drugs

Belarus is one of the largest sources of illegal cigarettes in the European Union: in 2017, the European Commissioner for Budget and Administration Günther Oettinger estimated that nearly 10% of illicit cigarettes in the EU originated from Belarus. It is alleged that the smuggling of the Belarusian-produced cigarettes is facilitated by various businessmen, such as Aliaksei Aleksin, who are close to Alexander Lukashenko. This contraband is thought to be an important revenue source for the Lukashenko regime. During the early weeks of the migrant crisis, Belarusian border guards told journalists that they got orders to encourage not only illegal migration, but also cigarette smuggling. In May 2021, Polish customs found the largest cigarette shipment ever in a rail container estimated at US$10 million.

Among the threats to the European Union voiced by Alexander Lukashenko in May 2021, the migrants were mentioned with the drugs.A former employee of the presidential administration, Anatoly Kotov, suggested that Belarusian authorities could organize the "drug problem" to the EU after the migration crisis ends.

See also
 European migrant crisis
 Belarus–European Union relations
 Belarus–Latvia relations
 Belarus–Lithuania relations
 Belarus–Poland relations
 Migration diplomacy
 Swarming (military)

Notes

References

Further reading

External links
 Poland fears armed border escalation, BBC News
 Video of migrants accompanied by the Belarusian State Border Committee, filmed by Frontex and published by the Lithuanian Ministry of the Interior
 Video of migrants accompanied by the Belarusian State Border Committee, filmed by Latvian border guards and published by sargs.lv
 

European Union border crisis
European Union border crisis
2021 in international relations
2022 in international relations
2021 in Latvia
2022 in Latvia
2021 in Lithuania
2022 in Lithuania
2023 in Lithuania
2021 in Poland
2022 in Poland
2020s in the European Union
Alexander Lukashenko
2021-2022 border crisis
Belarus–Germany relations
Belarus–Iraq relations
Belarus–Latvia border
2021-2022 European Union border crisis
2021-2022 European Union border crisis
2021-2022 European Union border crisis
2021-2022 European Union border crisis
2021-2022 European Union border crisis
2021-2022 European Union border crisis
European Border and Coast Guard
Foreign relations of Kurdistan Region
Illegal immigration to Europe
Kurdish diaspora in Europe
Latvia–Russia relations
Lithuania–Russia relations
Migrant crises
Poland–Russia relations
Russia–European Union relations
Human rights abuses in Belarus
Immigration to the European Union
Refugees in Europe
Multilateral relations of Belarus
Kurdish refugees
Von der Leyen Commission